Jan Vincentsz van der Vinne or Jan de Nageoires (1663 – 1721) was an 18th-century painter from the Northern Netherlands.

Biography
He was born in 1663, in Haarlem. According to Houbraken he was one of the three sons of Vincent van der Vinne, "the one working more, and the other working less", in the arts.

According to the RKD, except for a short stay in England in the years 1686-1688, he worked in Haarlem, like his brothers, the painters Laurens and Isaac. He is known for Italianate landscapes and scenes with horsemen. The painter Jan Mensing was his pupil.

He died in 1721, in Haarlem.

References

Jan Vincentsz van der Vinne on Artnet

1663 births
1721 deaths
17th-century Dutch painters
18th-century Dutch painters
18th-century Dutch male artists
Artists from Haarlem
Dutch male painters